Barbara Sukowa (born 2 February 1950) is a German actress of screen and stage and singer. She has received three German Film Awards for Best Actress, three Bavarian Film Awards, Cannes Film Festival Award for Best Actress, Venice Film Festival Award, as well as nominations for European Film Awards, César Awards and Grammy Awards.

Sukowa is best known for her work with directors Rainer Werner Fassbinder and Margarethe von Trotta. She rose to prominence after starring in the West German miniseries Berlin Alexanderplatz directed by Fassbinder, and the following year went to star in his drama film Lola, for which she received her first German Film Award for Best Actress. Also in 1981, Sukowa starred in Marianne and Juliane directed by Margarethe von Trotta.  They would go on to work on six more films together. For her performance, she also received German Film Award and Venice Film Festival Award for Best Actress. In 1986, she won the Cannes Film Festival Award for Best Actress for performance in the drama film Rosa Luxemburg.

In 1990s, Sukowa starred in a number of international films, most notable, Europa (1991) directed by Lars von Trier, Voyager (1991) by Volker Schlöndorff, M. Butterfly by David Cronenberg, and Johnny Mnemonic (1995) by Robert Longo. In later career, she played Hildegard of Bingen in 2009 drama film Vision, and Hannah Arendt in the biographical film Hannah Arendt (2012). In 2019, she starred in French drama film Two of Us, for which she received Lumières Award for Best Actress and César Award for Best Actress nomination.

Life and career
Sukowa was born in Bremen, Germany, in 1950. She speaks German, English and French. After studying acting at the Max Reinhardt Seminar in Vienna, Sukowa's stage debut was in Berlin in 1971, in a production of Peter Handke's Der Ritt über den Bodensee. The same year, Günter Beelitz invited her to join the ensemble of the Darmstädter National Theatre. She also worked in Frankfurt am Main and Hamburg, in collaboration with directors such as Luc Bondy, playing Marion in Büchner's Danton's Death and Helena in A Midsummer Night's Dream. Other Shakespeare roles in Europe were Rosalind in As You Like It and Desdemona in Othello. She performed in Ibsen's The Master Builder.

In addition to her stage work, Sukowa is associated with the New German Cinema. Her performance as Mieze in Rainer Werner Fassbinder's miniseries Berlin Alexanderplatz (1980) earned her the German Best Young Actress Award. The following year, her performance of the title role in Fassbinder's drama film Lola earned her a German Film Award for Best Actress. Also that year, she starred in Marianne and Juliane directed by Margarethe von Trotta. For this performance she also received German Film Award for Best Actress and Venice Film Festival Golden Phoenix Award for Best Actress. She starred in Die Jäger (1982) directed by Károly Makk, Un dimanche de flic (1983) by Michel Vianey, and Équateur by Serge Gainsbourg. In 1985, Sukowa made her American television debut starring in the CBS miniseries Space, based on James A. Michener's novel.

In 1986, Sukowa played Polish socialist Rosa Luxemburg in the biographical drama film Rosa Luxemburg directed by Margarethe von Trotta. She received Cannes Film Festival Award for Best Actress for her performance, and well as another German Film Award for Best Actress. In 1987, she starred in Days to Remember directed by Jeanine Meerapfel, receiving nomination for a German Film Award for Best Actress, and appeared in American action film The Sicilian opposite Christopher Lambert. In 1990, she starred in The African Woman directed by Margarethe von Trotta.

Sukowa moved to Brooklyn, New York City in 1991. In 1991, she starred opposite Sam Shepard in Voyager directed by Volker Schlöndorff, and Europa by Lars von Trier. Both films received positive reviews from critics. Sukowa was nominated for European Film Award for Best Supporting Actress for Voyager, and European Film Award for Best European Actress of the Year for Europa. In 1993, she starred in M. Butterfly directed by David Cronenberg. In 1995, she appeared in Johnny Mnemonic directed by Robert Longo. Sukowa also starred in a made-for-television films Lost Souls (1998) and The Lady in Question (1999).

Sukowa has developed a parallel career as a classical music narrator and speaker. She has performed the Speaker's role in Arnold Schönberg's Pierrot lunaire, first with the Schoenberg Ensemble under Reinbert de Leeuw, and later with ensembles in Paris, London, Berlin, St. Petersburg, Madrid, Rome, Tokyo, Salzburg, Los Angeles, and New York City. She has performed the Speaker's role in Schönberg's Gurrelieder with the Berlin Philharmonic under Claudio Abbado, and is featured on the recordings with Abbado and the Vienna Philharmonic, and Esa-Pekka Salonen and the Philharmonia. She narrated Prokofiev's Peter and the Wolf both in concert and on record, as well as on a recording of Mendelssohn's music for A Midsummer Night's Dream. In English, she has worked in a production of The Cherry Orchard (Princeton, New Jersey, 2000). Sukowa has performed in Arthur Honegger's Jeanne d'Arc au bûcher and Kurt Weill's The Threepenny Opera. She performed speaking and singing role in de Leeuw's Im wunderschönen Monat Mai in 2004. She performed the speaking role in the US premiere of Michael Jarrell's Cassandre in March 2006, and in the New York City premiere that month, with musicians from the Saint Louis Symphony Orchestra.  At the 51st Annual Grammy Awards, she received Grammy Award nomination for Im wunderschönen Monat Mai. Sukowa is also the front singer of the Band the X-Patsys , which she founded with visual artists Jon Kessler and Robert Longo.

In 2004, Sukowa was a member of the jury at the 26th Moscow International Film Festival. In 2012, she was on the jury for the 62nd Berlin International Film Festival.

In 2009, Sukowa played the role of Hildegard of Bingen in 2009 drama film Vision directed by Margarethe von Trotta, receiving another Bavarian Film Award for Best Actress. In 2012, Sukowa starred as German-Jewish philosopher and political theorist Hannah Arendt in the German-Luxembourgian-French biographical film Hannah Arendt directed by Margarethe von Trotta. The film and her performance received positive reviews from critics. Sukowa received another Bavarian Film Award for Best Actress and German Film Award for Best Performance by an Actress in a Leading Role, and well as European Film Award for Best Actress nomination. In 2016, she appeared on Maria Schrader' drama film Stefan Zweig: Farewell to Europe, and later had supporting roles in Atomic Blonde (2017), Gloria Bell (2018) and Native Son (2019).

From 2015 to 2018, Sukowa starred as Katarina Jones in the American television series 12 Monkeys. She continued appearing on American television guest-starring on Hunters starring Al Pacino, and had a recurring role on the Apple TV+ series Servant. In 2022, she was cast in the thriller The Swarm based on the Frank Schätzing best-seller.

In 2019, Sukowa starred in French romance drama film Two of Us, for which she received Lumières Award for Best Actress and César Award for Best Actress nomination.

In 2022, Sukowa starred opposite Ben Kingsley in the biographical film Dalíland about Salvador Dalí, playing Gala Dalí. It premiered at the 2022 Toronto International Film Festival.

Personal life
She is married to the artist and director Robert Longo, with whom she has performed as a singer. She has three sons, one from her earlier marriage to Hans-Michael Rehberg, one from her relationship with Daniel Olbrychski, and one with Longo.

Filmography

Film

Television 

General source for Awards and nomination — AllMovie

References

External links 

 Fassbinder Foundation

1950 births
Living people
German film actresses
Actors from Bremen
Best Actress German Film Award winners
Cannes Film Festival Award for Best Actress winners
Best Actress Lumières Award winners
German stage actresses
German women singers
20th-century German actresses
21st-century German actresses
German expatriates in the United States